7th Armored may refer to:

7th Armoured Brigade (disambiguation), several units
7th Armoured Division (disambiguation), several units